Daniel Edward Carmichael (January 2, 1907 – August 3, 1960) was an American artistic gymnast who competed in the 1932 Summer Olympics. He was born and died in Los Angeles, California. In 1932 he won the bronze medal in the vault competition.

References
Ed Carmichael's profile at Sports Reference.com

1907 births
1960 deaths
American male artistic gymnasts
Gymnasts at the 1932 Summer Olympics
Olympic bronze medalists for the United States in gymnastics
Medalists at the 1932 Summer Olympics